The Ludington Pumped Storage Plant is a hydroelectric plant and reservoir in Ludington, Michigan.  It was built between 1969 and 1973 at a cost of $315 million and is owned jointly by Consumers Energy and DTE Energy and operated by Consumers Energy.  At the time of its construction, it was the largest pumped storage hydroelectric facility in the world.

Characteristics 

The  reservoir is located on the banks of Lake Michigan.

The power plant consists of six reversible turbines that can each generate 312 megawatts of electricity for a total output of 1,872 megawatts.

At night, during low demand for electricity, the turbines run in reverse to pump water  uphill from Lake Michigan into the reservoir. The plant takes advantage of the natural steep sand dune landform of eastern Lake Michigan. During periods of peak demand water is released to generate power. Electrical generation can begin within two minutes with peak electric output of 1872 MW achieved in under 30 minutes.

This process was designed to level the load of nearby nuclear power plants on the grid. It also replaces the need to build natural gas peak power plants used only during high demand. The Ludington Pumped Storage plant is connected to six 345-kV Transmission lines, all owned and maintained by METC, a subsidiary of ITC Holdings.

The project was given the 1973 award for "Outstanding Civil Engineering Achievement" by the American Society of Civil Engineers.

Upgrade 

Consumers Energy discussed plans in 2008 to extend the life of the facility and upgrade the pumps to increase efficiency by up to 9%. Consumers Energy also planned to tap the wind power resources along the eastern Lake Michigan shore with wind farms. Because wind is an intermittent power source and may inconveniently deliver large amounts of power during periods of low electric demand, pumped storage facilities are desirable to have on the same grid with large-scale wind farms. The available pumped storage capacity, along with the wind characteristics, partly determine the maximum contribution wind power can make to the overall electricity use in a region.

Consumers Energy and Detroit Edison announced an $800 million upgrade on February 7, 2011.  The six-year project would begin in 2013 and extend the plant's life by at least forty years and upgrade the generating capacity from 1,872 megawatts to 2,172 megawatts. Plans for the upgrade include replacing all six of the plant's turbines, which would increase the plant's total generating capacity by 15 percent, and efficiency by 5 percent. Upon completion, the plant will produce enough power for a community of 1.65 million (a quarter million increase).
As of August 2020, five of the six turbines had been successfully replaced; the project was expected to be completed in May or June 2021. However claims of defective parts and timeline overruns led Consumers Power and Detroit Edison to sue the project contractor, Toshiba America in April 2022.

See also 

 List of energy storage projects
 List of pumped-storage hydroelectric power stations
 Robert Moses Niagara Power Plant, another large pumped-storage facility on the Great Lakes
 Bath County Pumped Storage Station, Virginia; the largest pumped storage facility in the world

References

External links 
Ludington Pumped Storage Plant (Official Site)

Dams in Michigan
Energy infrastructure completed in 1973
Hydroelectric power plants in Michigan
Buildings and structures in Mason County, Michigan
Pumped-storage hydroelectric power stations in the United States
DTE Energy
CMS Energy
Reservoirs in Michigan
Bodies of water of Mason County, Michigan
1973 establishments in Michigan